The 19th National Hockey League All-Star Game was played in Montreal Forum on October 20, 1965, where the host Montreal Canadiens lost to a team of all-stars from the remaining NHL teams 5–2. It was the last time that an All-Star Game was held at the start of the season.

The game

Game summary

MVP: Gordie Howe, Detroit Red Wings
Attendance: 14,284

Source: Podnieks

Rosters

Note: G = Goaltender, D = Defence, C = Centre, LW = Left Wing, RW = Right Wing
Source: Podnieks

See also
1965–66 NHL season

References
 

Notes:

All-Star Game
National Hockey League All-Star Games
1965
Ice hockey competitions in Montreal
1960s in Montreal
1965 in Quebec
October 1965 sports events in Canada